StackPath is an American edge computing platform provider headquartered in Dallas, Texas. Its founding team was led by Lance Crosby, who also co-founded SoftLayer Technologies, acquired by IBM in 2013.

Acquisitions 

 MaxCDN (CDN), 2016
 Staminus (DDoS mitigation), 2016
 Fireblade (WAF), 2016
 Cloak (VPN), 2016
 Highwinds Network Group (CDN and VPN), 2017
 Server Density (Monitoring)

Subsidiaries

MaxCDN 
NetDNA, LLC was founded in 2009 as a content delivery network (CDN) with a focus on enterprise customers. The company was founded by David Henzel and Christopher Ueland in Los Angeles.  

In 2010, NetDNA partnered with Wowza to launch the HDDN.com brand, a CDN for streaming video. 

By 2010, the MaxCDN brand was created as a simpler CDN for both small and large businesses. MaxCDN, LLC operated as a division of NetDNA, LLC. 

In 2011, Ben Neumann was CEO of NetDNA. In 2011, NetDNA completed a funding round with Chelsea Management in Los Angeles.

In 2013, NetDNA rebranded the company and its services as MaxCDN, conslidating other services such as HDDN.com under the same name, with the original NetDNA enterprise service rebranded as MaxCDN Enterprise.

MaxCDN was acquired by StackPath in 2016.

Divestitures 
In 2019, StackPath sold its VPN lines of business, including IPVanish (acquired as part of the Highwinds Network Group) and Encrypt.me (the new brand of Cloak), to J2 Global.

Investors 
StackPath has received funding from investors including Abry Partners, Juniper Networks, and Cox Communications.

Founders 
StackPath was founded May 5, 2015, by Lance Crosby, Greg Bock, Steven Canale, Ryan Carter, Paul Drew, Kenji Fukasawa, Jason Gulledge, Andrew Higginbotham, James Leaverton, Andrew Maten, Dawn Mumm, Nick Nelson, and Josh Reese.

References 

Content delivery networks
Companies based in Dallas
Internet technology companies of the United States
American companies established in 2015
Internet security
DDoS mitigation companies
Cloud infrastructure
Cloud computing providers